Rwamagana is a district (akarere) in Eastern Province, Rwanda. Its capital is Rwamagana city, which is also the provincial capital.

Sectors 
Rwamagana district is divided into 14 sectors (imirenge): Fumbwe, Gahengeri, Gishari, Karenge, Kigabiro, Muhazi, Munyaga, Munyiginya, Musha, Muyumbu, Mwulire, Nyakariro, Nzige and Rubona.
Rwamagana is 'a place of a hundred things' in Kinyarwanda, as it contains the word 'magana' a word meaning 'one-hundred' in many bantu dialects. The district's name 'Rwamagana' was meant to imply a place of abundance.

External links 
 
 Rwamagana District government website

Districts of Rwanda